Kirk Williams Jr. is an American professional basketball player who currently plays for the London Lightning of the National Basketball League of Canada (NBL). He plays the small forward and power forward positions. Williams played high school basketball for Woodlands High School in Hartsdale, New York and moved on to compete with Longwood and Bridgeport in college. In 2014, he was named NBL Canada Sixth Man of the Year, and in 2015 helped the Express win the championship and became the Finals' Most Valuable Player. And in 2018 he won another championship with the London Lightning . Kirk Williams Jr is married to April Mercado-Williams and they have 4 kids together Angel, Abigail, Kirk Jr 3rd and Jove Kai Mercado-Williams

Early life and career 
Williams was born in White Plains, New York to Kirk Williams Sr. and Margaret Turner. He has one sister, Dashonda Turner.

Kirk Williams Jr. Is married to April Mercado-Williams and they have 4 kids together name Angel, Abigail, Kirk Jr. and Jove Kai Mercado-Williams

Kirk Jr. attended Woodlands High School in Hartsdale, New York, where he played varsity basketball for three seasons and football for two seasons. As a junior, he averaged 16.5 points per game. In his senior season, Williams averaged 17.1 points, 7.6 rebounds, and 2.5 steals, helping his team finish with an 18–5 record. He also earned All-State and all-conference honors.

College career 
Williams played his first three seasons of college basketball at Longwood University with the Lancers under head coach Mike Gillian. He capped his freshman year averaging 7.6 points, 4.1 rebounds, and 1.1 assists.

References

External links 
 Kirk Williams on RealGM

Living people
American expatriate basketball people in Canada
American men's basketball players
Basketball players from New York (state)
Bridgeport Purple Knights men's basketball players
London Lightning players
Longwood Lancers men's basketball players
Mississauga Power players
Edmonton Stingers players
Niagara River Lions players
People from White Plains, New York
Sportspeople from Westchester County, New York
Windsor Express players
Forwards (basketball)
1986 births